Anna Hedh (born 18 March 1967) is a Swedish politician who served as a Member of the European Parliament (MEP) from 2004 until 2019. She is a member of the Swedish Social Democratic Party, part of the Progressive Alliance of Socialists and Democrats.

Hedh served on the European Parliament's Committee on the Internal Market and Consumer Protection. She was also a substitute for the Committee on Women's Rights and Gender Equality, and a member of the delegation for relations with the Palestinian Legislative Council. In addition to her committee assignments, she served as a member of the European Parliament Intergroup on Western Sahara; the European Parliament Intergroup on LGBT Rights; and the European Parliament Intergroup on Children's Rights.

Career
 Two-year social studies programme at Hvitfeldtska gymnasiet upper secondary school (1983–1985)
 Nursing course, health care administration in Gothenburg (1986)
 Four semesters university studies, youth recreation leader (1987–1989)
 Coordinator, association of local authorities, social services (1998)
 Care assistant (since 1986)
 Children's nurse (1987)
 Catering assistant (1987–1989)
 Youth hostel receptionist (1988)
 Receptionist at driving school (1989–1991)
 Youth recreation leader (1989–1991)
 Manager of youth recreation centre (1992–1997)
 Recreational assistant (1997–1999)
 Treatment assistant (1993–1995)
 Policy advisor, Kalmar (1999–2002)
 Chairwoman of Södra Öland branch of the Social Democratic Party (since 1999)
 Member of the district executive of the Social Democratic party, Kalmar county (since 2000)
 Substitute member of the municipal executive board (since 1999)
 Member of the committee on cultural affairs and recreation (1999–2002)
 Member of Mörbylånga Council (1999–2002)
 Vice-Chairwoman of the municipal executive board, opposition councillor (2003–2004)
 Vice-Chairwoman of the Öland association of local authorities (2003–2004)
 Member of the Social Democratic Party national executive (since 2000)

References

External links
Personal Blog
European Parliament biography

1967 births
Living people
People from Uppsala
Swedish bloggers
Swedish Social Democratic Party MEPs
MEPs for Sweden 2004–2009
MEPs for Sweden 2009–2014
MEPs for Sweden 2014–2019
21st-century women MEPs for Sweden
Swedish women bloggers
Articles containing video clips